Kexholm County was a county of the Swedish Empire from 1634 to 1721, when the southern part was ceded to the Russian Empire in the Treaty of Nystad. The capital of the county was Kexholm, which today is Priozersk.

History
The county was ceded to Sweden by Russia together with Ingria by the Treaty of Stolbovo in 1617. The county extended to the parishes of Lieksa in North and of Suojärvi in the East. In the South and West, the county was bordered by Viborg and Nyslott County. 

Following the Great Northern War southern and eastern parts were ceded to Russia in 1721, and the territory that remained was reconstituted into the County of Kymmenegård and Nyslott, with the remainder of the Viborg and Nyslott County. In 1743 following a new conflict part of this county was also ceded to Russia in the Treaty of Åbo. The ceded parts of the County of Viborg and Nyslott and the County of Kexholm were at first part of the Saint Petersburg Governorate, but in 1744 they were reconstituted with new conquests into the Russian Vyborg Governorate, which also became known as Old Finland. Remainder of the County of Kymmenegård and Nyslott was joined with some parts of the County of Nyland and Tavastehus in 1747 into the County of Savolax and Kymmenegård.

After the Russian victory in the Finnish War of 1809, Sweden ceded all its territory in Finland to Russia by the Treaty of Fredrikshamn. As part of the Russian Empire Finland came to constitute a separate grand duchy. In 1812 Russia made the territories of the Vyborg Governorate part of the new Grand Duchy of Finland as Viipuri Province.

Maps

Governors

 Henrik Månsson 1634–1636
 Magnus Nieroth 1636–1641
 Henrik Piper 1641–1642 (acting)
 Reinhold Mettstake 1642–1652
 Jakob Törnsköld 1652–1656
 Karl von Scheiding 1657–1660
 Patrick Ogilwie 1660–1674
 Berendt Mellin 1674–1690

See also
Vyborg Governorate
Karelia

Former counties of Sweden
Former provinces of Finland
1634 establishments in Sweden
1721 disestablishments in Sweden